Goin' Home is a studio album by American saxophonist Archie Shepp and pianist Horace Parlan. After their work in the 1960s, Shepp and Parlan both faced career challenges as the jazz scene diverged stylistically. They left the United States for Europe during the 1970s and met each other in Denmark before recording the album on April 25, 1977, at Sweet Silence Studio in Copenhagen.

A jazz and gospel album, Goin' Home features Shepp and Parlan's interpretations of African-American folk melodies and spirituals. Its title is an allusion to Shepp's return to his African cultural roots. Shepp had never recorded spirituals before and was overcome with emotion during the album's recording because of the historical and cultural context of the songs.

Although it surprised jazz listeners upon its release in 1977, Goin' Home was praised by music critics for its reverent tone and stylistic deviation from Shepp's previous free jazz works. Shepp and Parlan were artistically satisfied with the album and subsequently recorded another album together, Trouble in Mind, in 1980. Goin' Home was reissued on CD by SteepleChase Records on May 3, 1994.

Background 

After rising to the top of the avant-garde jazz movement during the 1960s, Archie Shepp faced a career challenge during the 1970s after the style lost popularity in the jazz scene, which had split between artists who played either a tamer or a more experimental sound. Shepp became a more mainstream performer, mostly playing hard bop, although he would occasionally return to his free jazz sound. To support himself financially, he spent most of his time playing in Europe. In 1972, jazz pianist Horace Parlan left the United States and eventually settled in Denmark, where Shepp had signed to SteepleChase Records.

Shepp became interested in recording gospel and, at the request of his producer at SteepleChase, recorded Goin' Home with Parlan. They recorded the album on April 25, 1977, at Sweet Silence Studio in Copenhagen, Denmark. Shepp played tenor saxophone on six pieces and soprano saxophone on three others. Both Shepp and Parlan were artistically satisfied with Goin' Home and recorded another album together, the blues-inspired Trouble in Mind, in 1980.

Composition and performance 
According to music journalist Tom Moon, Goin' Home is a reverent jazz and gospel album played with straightforward simplicity by Shepp and Parlan. They interpret nine traditional Negro spirituals, featuring African-American folk melodies that originated from the 1920s and before. Along with Trouble in Mind and Looking at Bird in 1980, Goin' Home is part of a series of albums delineated in Shepp's discography as "modular explorations of traditional musical styles", which is itself in Shepp's broader series of musical "portraits of the Diaspora". The album's title alludes to a return to African cultural roots.

Shepp viewed Goin' Home as his attempt to cross the span of time and history between modern African Americans and the black slaves symbolized by the spirituals. In an interview for Down Beat, Shepp said that it was the first time he had recorded spirituals or made "any kind of serious statement about them", and said that he started to cry when he started playing on the album due to "the strain, the spiritual weight of the moment". He recalled being momentarily afraid that he would not be able to go through with the album's recording because of his emotional state, which he explained:

The album has a melodic form, and employs pentatonic scales for melodic development, a practice common in African and African-American folk music. Goin' Home is mostly tempoless, as most of the pieces are performed in a rubato-like free rhythm. Shepp and Parlan perform sudden accelerations and intended delays and halts, particularly at the end of bars, phrases, and sections in a piece. Most of the spirituals have a thirty-two-bar form, with the eight-bar section comprising four two-bar phrases wherein two choruses of the spiritual are played. Shepp and Parlan's interpretations include few choruses from the original spirituals.

Eschewing common jazz practice, Shepp does not improvise new melodic lines within the spirituals' harmonic framework, but plays short, impromptu passages around a melodic idea. Parlan plays piano solos on only two of the album's pieces. Shepp contributes a tonal roughness to the songs with growled sounds, which he plays by singing or humming into his saxophone. He also uses harmonic overtones, breathy tonal weight, and expressive chromatic development of melody to add textural and timbral variety to the songs. Shepp and Parlan's reverent takes on "Amazing Grace" and Go Down Moses" exhibit split tones and fortes.

Release and reception 

Goin' Home was first released in 1977 by the Danish label SteepleChase Records. It was reissued on CD by SteepleChase on May 3, 1994.

Jazz listeners were divided in their reaction to the album. According to Doug Ramsey of Texas Monthly, some listeners were surprised by Shepp's stylistic change, while others viewed the record as a "fulfillment of promise". Ramsey believed it revealed a "tenderness and humor" from Shepp that his 1960s work only hinted at, writing that it "disclosed an Archie Shepp that many had never known, warm rather than blistering hot, witty rather than contemptuously sardonic". John Swenson, writing in The Rolling Stone Jazz Record Guide (1985), praised Shepp's work with Parlan and found Goin' Home "particularly heartfelt." Fernando Gonzalez of The Boston Globe called it "exquisite", and C. Gerald Fraser of The New York Times wrote in 1987 that "this marriage of avant-garde and soul" is "regarded as a classic." Art Lange of CODA magazine praised Shepp's "exquisite control" of his instrument, which he "quite literally" makes "able [to] talk", and found the spirituals to have been "sung" rather than just performed. Lange added that the emotional aspect is more impressive than the technical skill and stated:

In a retrospective review for AllMusic, jazz critic Scott Yanow found the performances "compelling" and said listeners who are "only familiar with Shepp's earlier Fire Music" will see the album as a "revelation." Moon believed its tempoless mood "gives the themes an extra shot of majesty" and found it "supremely melodic", writing that both Shepp and Parlan "do whatever is necessary to bring the spirit to the forefront." JazzTimes cited Goin' Home as one of "the finest [albums] of his career", and Tom Hull of The Village Voice cited it as SteepleChase's best release. Phil Johnson of The Independent wrote that the album "can be listened to almost without cease." Jazz historian Eric Nisenson called it "one of the most moving albums of the Seventies", but qualified his praise by critiquing that Shepp, an iconic figure in free jazz, "was no longer the firebrand who had so frightened and unsettled some white critics and jazz fans." Nisenson felt that, like Pharoah Sanders, Shepp's "trial by fire at the heart of the Sixties avant-garde had made him an unusually expressive musician," and Goin' Home showed that he was "finding inspiration in the entire black musical tradition."

Track listing 
All songs are traditional compositions, excepted where noted, and were arranged by Archie Shepp.

Personnel
Credits are adapted from the album's liner notes.

 Per Grunnet – design
 Freddy Hansson – engineer
 Horace Parlan – piano
 Flemming Rasmussen – assistant engineer
 Archie Shepp – arranger, soprano saxophone, tenor saxophone
 Gorm Valentin – photography
 Nils Winther – photographer, producer

References

Bibliography

External links
 

1977 albums
Archie Shepp albums
Horace Parlan albums
SteepleChase Records albums